The Arsonist is the sixth full-length studio album by Deadlock.  It was released on July 26, 2013, and is the first to have John Gahlert (previously the band's bass guitarist) on harsh vocals, following the departure of Johannes Prem and the first to feature Ferdinand Rewicki on guitar, replacing Gert Rymen who left on February 8, 2013. It is also the last album to feature Tobias Graf on drums. Graf left the band on April 28, 2014, and died that same year on September 4 at the age of 35.

Track listing

Personnel
Sabine Scherer - clean vocals
John Gahlert - harsh vocals
Sebastian Reichl - guitar, keyboard, programming
Ferdinand Rewicki - guitar, bass guitar
Tobias Graf - drums

Chart performance

References

2013 albums
Deadlock (band) albums